Benacerraf ( Ben-Aseraf) is a surname. Notable people with the surname include:

Baruj Benacerraf (born 1920), Venezuelan immunologist
Margot Benacerraf (born 1926), Venezuelan film director
Paul Benacerraf (born 1931), French-American philosopher

Maghrebi Jewish surnames
Surnames of Moroccan origin